Elizabeth Hall Boyer (born 1952) is an American fantasy author who produced books in the 1980s and early 1990s.

Career 
Boyer studied English literature and Scandinavian mythology at Brigham Young University. She lives on a farm near Atlanta and no longer writes.

Boyer is considered an early contributor to the mass-market fantasy genre and a contemporary of Niel Hancock.

Influences 
Her work is deeply influenced by Norse mythology, and set in a fantasy world with a similar climate and geography as the Scandinavia of Norse myths. While Norse myths influenced fantasy, including authors like Tolkien and Lewis, Boyer's works followed them more closely than other writers.

Her stories are characterized by elements like light and dark elves, dwarves, trolls, sorcerers, ley lines, burial mounds, and wizards. Boyer follows the Norse versions of these elements closely without much deviation. Boyer's early books are dominated by the theme of the heroic quest.

Criticism 
Her works continue to be popular since their publication, although critics consider her later works inferior compared to her original Alfar series. The Skyla series was noted as "less ambitious" and darker yet slow-paced, patchy, and tentative.

Other critics attribute her lack of popular appeal compared to contemporaries like Tolkien and Lewis to a narrower thematic subtext. Boyer's works require readers to be interested in Norse mythology in order to fully appreciate them, which led to a lack of wider acceptance and recognition as a fantasy pioneer.

Bibliography

World of the Alfar 
 The Sword and the Satchel (1980)
 The Elves and the Otterskin (1981)
 The Thrall and the Dragon's Heart (1982)
 The Wizard and the Warlord (1983)

 "The Stillborn Heritage" (Four from the Witch World, 1989)

Wizard's War 
 The Troll's Grindstone (1986)
 The Curse of Slagfid (1989)
 The Dragon's Carbuncle (1990)
 The Lord of Chaos (1991)

 "The Stillborn Heritage" (Four from the Witch World, 1989)

Skyla 
 The Clan of the Warlord (1992)
 The Black Lynx (1993)
 Keeper of Cats (1995)

Historical fiction 

 A Story of Survival: Marguerite de la Roque (1975)
 Freydis and Gudrid  (1976)

Short stories 

 "Borrowing Trouble" (Catfantastic, 1989)
 "The Last Gift" (Catfantastic II, 1990)
 "A Foreigner Comes to Reddyville" (Washed by a Wave of Wind: Science Fiction from the Corridor, 1994)

References

External links
 
 Boyer, Elizabeth H at The Encyclopedia of Fantasy
 Review of Wizard's War series.

20th-century American novelists
American fantasy writers
American women novelists
Brigham Young University alumni
Novelists from Idaho
Women science fiction and fantasy writers
20th-century American women writers
Living people
1952 births